Phthirusa pyrifolia is a subtropical flowering plant species of the family Loranthaceae. It grows in forests from Mexico through Central America, Peru, Bolivia, and Brazil. It flowers and fruits year-round; its small berries range in color from orange to deep red when ripe.

Phthirusa pyrifolia is used medicinally by people in parts of the Peruvian Amazon.

References

External links
 

Flora of Bolivia
Flora of Brazil
Flora of Costa Rica
Flora of Mexico
Flora of Peru
Loranthaceae